Giuseppe Cerise was an Italian luger who competed in the mid-1980s. A natural track luger, he won a silver medal in the men's singles event at the 1984 FIL World Luge Natural Track Championships in Kreuth, West Germany.

References
Natural track World Championships results: 1979-2007

Italian male lugers
Living people
Year of birth missing (living people)